The 1999–2000 Greek Football Cup was the 58th edition of the Greek Football Cup.

Tournament details

Totally 56 teams participated, 18 from Alpha Ethniki, 18 from Beta, and 20 from Gamma. It was held in 6 rounds, included final. An additional round was held between first and second, with 4 matches, in order that the teams would continue to be 16.

This year came back the Group stage, after its provisional three-year suppression. Until quarter-finals, all matches were single. The most interesting round was Second, after drawing of Olympiacos against PAOK and Aris against Panathinaikos, with the home teams to take the qualification with difficulty.

Final was contested by AEK Athens, who previously eliminated rivals Olympiacos and Ionikos, for their first and only time in history, having favourable draws in their course to the Final, but also after a very difficult qualification from the Group stage in the goals difference, after triple equivalence in standings with Leonidio and Panetolikos. However, the win with score 8–0 against Nafpaktiakos Asteras in quarter-finals was remarkable.

AEK Athens easily won the game 3-0 and earned their 12th cup in club's history. A remarkable moment of the Final was at 32nd minute while score was 0-0, after a cross from Petkov, Demis Nikolaidis scored with his hand. The referee Douros did not realize the violation of Nikolaidis and ran towards the center of the field, with Nikolaidis immediately showing him that he should not count the goal. The referee approached Nikolaidis, who explained to him exactly what happened. As a result, the referee changed his decision, canceled the goal and gave handball and showed Nikolaidis a yellow card for his violation. Nikolaidis was later honored by the International Olympic Committee for his fair play towards the referee of the final.

Calendar

Group stage

The phase was played in a single round-robin format. Each win gained 3 points, each draw gained 1 point, and each loss did not gain any points.

Group 1

Group 2

Group 3

Group 4

Group 5

Group 6

Group 7

Group 8

Group 9

Marko and A.S. Neapoli qualified to the Additional Round without matches.

Knockout phase
Each tie in the knockout phase, apart from the first three rounds and the final, was played over two legs, with each team playing one leg at home. The team that scored more goals on aggregate over the two legs advanced to the next round. If the aggregate score was level, the away goals rule was applied, i.e. the team that scored more goals away from home over the two legs advanced. If away goals were also equal, then extra time was played. The away goals rule was again applied after extra time, i.e. if there were goals scored during extra time and the aggregate score was still level, the visiting team advanced by virtue of more away goals scored. If no goals were scored during extra time, the winners were decided by a penalty shoot-out. In the first three rounds and the final, which were played as a single match, if the score was level at the end of normal time, extra time was played, followed by a penalty shoot-out if the score was still level.The mechanism of the draws for each round is as follows:
There are no seedings, and teams from the same group can be drawn against each other.

Additional round

|}

Bracket

Round of 16

|}

Quarter-finals

|}

Semi-finals

Summary

|}

Matches

AEK Athens won 5–3 on aggregate.

Ionikos won 6–2 on aggregate.

Final

The 56th Greek Cup Final was played at the Olympic Stadium.

References

External links
Greek Cup 1999–2000 at RSSSF
Greek Cup 1999–2000 at Hellenic Football Federation's official site

Greek Football Cup seasons
Greek Cup
Cup